Bonaparte is the stage name of Berlin-based Swiss electronic rock songwriter and producer Tobias Jundt. Jundt is the only permanent member in the studio, collaborating with a changing cast of live musicians and performers when touring. Since 2006 Bonaparte has performed over 700 shows worldwide, playing in such places as Europe, China, Russia, New Zealand and the United States of America. 

The band is characterized by their expressive critically acclaimed live performances. German newspaper Der Tagesspiegel describes the band as "A multi-ethnic group ruled by the party-Kaiser; a trash circus unleashed".

Style

Bonaparte is known for its socio-critical lyrics as well as its celebration of hedonism. The Berliner Zeitung described Bonaparte as "analoge Bohème,".

Media awards
 "Radio Award Für Neue Musik" from Popkomm, Germany, 2008
 "Style Award Domestic" from Musikexpress, Germany, 2009
 "Too Much" No. 1 Biggest Hit in 2009 from 78s Magazine, Switzerland, 2009
 "Best Art Project" from 16 Tons Awards, Moscow, Russia, 2009
 Schweizer Musikpreis, Nomination, 2016

Band members
 Tobias Jundt is the only permanent member of the group.

Discography

Studio albums
Too Much (2008)
My Horse Likes You (2010)
Sorry, We're Open (2012)
Bonaparte (2014)
The Return of Stravinsky Wellington (2017)
Was Mir Passiert (2019)

Other albums
Remuched (2009) (Double CD with remixes and live material)
Rave Rave Remix (2011) (Remix album)
0110111 - Quantum Physics & A Horseshoe (2011) (Live DVD and soundtrack)
OST Beck's Letzter Sommer (album) (2015)

Singles
Too Much (2008) (CD)
Computer in Love (2010) (10' Vinyl with Remixes by Modeselektor, Siriusmo, Jason Forrest)
Fly a Plane Into Me (2010) (7' Vinyl. b-side: Things Are More Like They Are Now)
Louie, Louie (2012) (free digital download only)
Quarantine (2012) (12' vinyl with Remixes by a.o. Housemeister)
Mañana Forever (2013) (digital only)
Into The Wild (2015) (digital only)
White Noize (2016) (digital only)
Melody X (2017) (digital only)

Remixes
2007: Die Piratenbraut – "12345und20" (Der Kleine Remix by Bonaparte)
2007: Mother's Ruin – "Godzilla vs. Bonaparte"
2009: Kissogram – "The Deserter" (Bonaparte Remix)
2011: Housemeister – "Music Is Awesome" (Bonaparte Remake Radio Edit & Extended Version)
2011: The Monsters – "I Want You" (Bonaparte Remix)
2012: MIA. – "Fallschirm" (Bonaparte Remix)
2012: Die Ärzte – "Ist das noch Punkrock?" (Bonaparte Remix)
2013: Dagobert – "Ich bin zu jung" (Bonaparte Remix)
2016: Da Cruz - Cala A Boca (Bonaparte Remix)

Collaborations
2016: Mule & Man (Bonaparte & Kid Simius): One Hand Clap EP

References

External links

Official website
Official online shop
Bonaparte Records

German electronic rock musical groups
German indie rock groups
Musical groups from Berlin
One-man bands